Joseph Rodgers may refer to:
 Joseph Rodgers (bishop), Roman Catholic bishop of Killaloe
 Joseph Lee Rodgers, American psychologist

See also
 Joseph Rogers (disambiguation)
 Joe M. Rodgers, American construction company executive and United States Ambassador to France